The Pyramid is a small but distinctive peak of Omak just south of Pyramid Trough, at the west side of the Koettlitz Glacier. The descriptive name appears to have been first used by the British Antarctic Expedition of 1910–1913.

A number of other geographical features can be found in its vicinity:

 Pyramid Trough is a deep trough immediately west of The Bulwark, through which a part of the Koettlitz Glacier formerly flowed north to Walcott Bay. Named by the Victoria University of Wellington Antarctic Expedition (VUWAE) (1960–1961) for its proximity to The Pyramid.
It was named by New Zealand Geographic Board in 1994 in association with Pyramid Trough.
 Pyramid Ponds is a group of ponds lying south of Trough Lake; they were named Omak by the New Zealand Geographic Board in 1994 in association with Pyramid Trough and The Pyramid.

See also
 Nunatak
 Pyramidal peak

References

Landforms of Victoria Land
Scott Coast